Michael Joseph Owens (January 1, 1859 – December 27, 1923) was an inventor of machines to automate the production of glass bottles.

Biography
He was born in Mason County, West Virginia on January 1, 1859. He left school at the age of 10 to start a glassware apprenticeship at J. H. Hobbs, Brockunier and Company in Wheeling, West Virginia. 

In 1888 he moved to Toledo, Ohio and worked for the Toledo Glass Factory owned by Edward Drummond Libbey. He was later promoted to foreman and then to supervisor. In 1891 Libbey opened a new plant in Findlay, Ohio, and Owens was put in charge of making the glass bulbs for Edison General Electric’s electric lights. There he simplified the process by inventing a mould-opening device which could be operated by a glassblower by foot and came up with a paste that prevent the bulbs from sticking to the moulds. This lowered the cost of bulbs by 90%, making them much more available for people. He formed the Owens Bottle Machine Company in 1903. His machines could produce glass bottles at a rate of 240 per minute, and reduce labor costs by 80%.

Owens and Libbey entered into a partnership and the company was renamed the Owens Bottle Company in 1919. In 1929 the company merged with the Illinois Glass Company to become the Owens-Illinois Glass Company.

He died on December 27, 1923.

Patents
 Apparatus for blowing glass
 Machine for blowing glass
 Machine for blowing glass
 Glass Shaping Machine
 Glass Shaping Machine

References

External links

Biographical Sketch with portrait

1859 births
1923 deaths
American inventors
History of glass
Glass makers